This is a list of 452 species in Hercostomus, a genus of long-legged flies in the family Dolichopodidae.

Hercostomus species

Hercostomus abnormis Yang, 1996
Hercostomus abortivus Parent, 1935
Hercostomus absimilis Yang & Grootaert, 1999
Hercostomus acutangulatus Yang & Saigusa, 1999
Hercostomus acuticornutus Yang, Saigusa & Masunaga, 2002
Hercostomus acutiformis Negrobov, Kumazawa & Tago, 2016
Hercostomus acutilobatus Liao, Zhou & Yang, 2006
Hercostomus acutus Yang & Saigusa, 2002
Hercostomus additus Parent, 1926
Hercostomus albibarbus Negrobov, 1976
Hercostomus albicoxa Pollet & Kazerani, 2017
Hercostomus albidipes Becker, 1922
Hercostomus albipodus Harmston & Knowlton, 1941
Hercostomus amabilis Wei & Song, 2006
Hercostomus amissus Bickel, 2008
Hercostomus amoenus (Becker, 1922)
Hercostomus anae Zhang, Yang & Masunaga, 2007
Hercostomus anatoliensis Tonguc, Grootaert & Barlas, 2016
Hercostomus angustus (Loew, 1857)
Hercostomus anomalipennis Stackelberg, 1933
Hercostomus apicilaris Yang & Grootaert, 1999
Hercostomus apiciniger Yang & Grootaert, 1999
Hercostomus apicispinus Yang & Saigusa, 2002
Hercostomus apiculatus Yang & Grootaert, 1999
Hercostomus apiculus Wei, 1997
Hercostomus apollo (Loew, 1869)
Hercostomus argentifacies Parent, 1933
Hercostomus argentifrons Oldenberg, 1916
Hercostomus argyraceus Negrobov & Chalaya, 1987
Hercostomus argyreus (Wei & Lu, 1996)
Hercostomus atypicalis Bickel, 2008
Hercostomus aurifacies Parent, 1933
Hercostomus aurifer (Thomson, 1869)
Hercostomus autumnalis Parent, 1935
Hercostomus baishanzuensis Yang & Yang, 1995
Hercostomus baishuihensis Yang & Saigusa, 2001
Hercostomus baixionggouanus Qilemoge, Liu & Yang, 2017
Hercostomus bakeri Frey, 1928
Hercostomus balensis Grichanov, 2004
Hercostomus basalis Yang, 1996
Hercostomus basantapuranus Yang, Saigusa & Masunaga, 2002
†Hercostomus bauckhorni (Meunier, 1915)
Hercostomus beijingensis Yang, 1996
Hercostomus biancistrus Yang & Saigusa, 2001
Hercostomus bicolor Yang & Saigusa, 2001
Hercostomus bidentatus Zhang, Yang & Grootaert, 2007
Hercostomus bigeminatus Yang & Grootaert, 1999
Hercostomus binatus Yang, 1999
Hercostomus binotatus De Meijere, 1916
Hercostomus bisetus Tang, Zhang & Yang, 2014
Hercostomus bispinifer Yang & Saigusa, 1999
Hercostomus bitinctus Becker, 1922
Hercostomus blepharopus Loew, 1871
Hercostomus brandbergensis Grichanov, 2020
Hercostomus brevicercus Yang & Saigusa, 2001
Hercostomus brevicornis Zhang, Yang & Grootaert, 2008
Hercostomus brevidigitalis Zhang, Yang & Grootaert, 2008
Hercostomus brevifurcatus Yang & Saigusa, 2001
Hercostomus brevilobatus Yang, Saigusa & Masunaga, 2002
Hercostomus brevis Yang, 1997
Hercostomus breviseta Zhang, Yang & Grootaert, 2008
Hercostomus brevispinus Yang & Saigusa, 2001
Hercostomus breviventris Parent, 1941
Hercostomus brunneipygus (De Meijere, 1916)
Hercostomus cacheae Harmston & Knowlton, 1941
Hercostomus caecus Becker, 1922
Hercostomus caixiae Zhang, Yang & Grootaert, 2003
Hercostomus calcaratus Stackelberg, 1931
Hercostomus canariensis Santos Abreu, 1929
Hercostomus chaetilamellatus Harmston & Knowlton, 1941
Hercostomus chaeturus Yang & Grootaert, 1999
Hercostomus chetifer (Walker, 1849)
Hercostomus chiaiensis Zhang, Yang & Masunaga, 2005
Hercostomus chiliwanus Yang, Saigusa & Masunaga, 2002
Hercostomus clavatus Wei, 1997
Hercostomus coloradensis Harmston, 1952
Hercostomus completus Yang, Saigusa & Masunaga, 2002
Hercostomus compositus Becker, 1922
Hercostomus comsus Wei & Song, 2005
Hercostomus concavus Yang & Saigusa, 1999
Hercostomus concisus Yang & Saigusa, 2002
Hercostomus conformis (Loew, 1857)
Hercostomus convergens (Loew, 1857)
Hercostomus costalis Van Duzee, 1923
Hercostomus costatus (Loew, 1857)
Hercostomus crassiseta Yang & Saigusa, 2001
Hercostomus crassivenus Bickel, 2008
Hercostomus cryptus Harmston & Knowlton, 1941
Hercostomus curvarmatus Yang & Saigusa, 2000
Hercostomus curvativus Yang & Saigusa, 1999
Hercostomus curvilobatus Yang & Saigusa, 2002
Hercostomus curviphallus Yang & Saigusa, 2002
Hercostomus curviseta Yang & Saigusa, 2002
Hercostomus curvispinosus Yang & Saigusa, 1999
Hercostomus curvispinus Yang & Saigusa, 2000
Hercostomus curvus Yang & Saigusa, 2002
Hercostomus cuspidicercus Olejnicek, 2004
Hercostomus cuspidiger Yang & Saigusa, 2000
Hercostomus cylindripyga Stackelberg, 1931
Hercostomus cyprius Parent, 1937
Hercostomus dacicus Parvu, 1991
Hercostomus dactylocera (Grootaert & Meuffels, 2001)
Hercostomus dashahensis Zhang, Wei & Yang, 2009
Hercostomus daweishanus Yang & Saigusa, 2001
Hercostomus dayaoshanensis Liao, Zhou & Yang, 2007
Hercostomus deltodontus Tang, Zhang & Yang, 2014
Hercostomus dentalis Yang, 1997
Hercostomus dentatus Yang, Saigusa & Masunaga, 2002
†Hercostomus devinctus (Meunier, 1907)
Hercostomus dichromopyga Stackelberg, 1933
Hercostomus digitatus Yang, 1997
Hercostomus digitiformis Yang & Grootaert, 1999
Hercostomus dilatitarsis Stackelberg, 1949
Hercostomus discriminatus Parent, 1925
Hercostomus dissectus Yang & Saigusa, 1999
Hercostomus dissimilis Yang & Saigusa, 1999
Hercostomus dorsiniger Yang & Saigusa, 2001
Hercostomus dorsiseta Yang & Saigusa, 2001
Hercostomus dui Wei, 1997
Hercostomus ebaeus Wei, 1997
Hercostomus effugius Wei & Song, 2006
Hercostomus effusus Wei & Song, 2006
Hercostomus elongatus Becker, 1922
Hercostomus emarginatus Yang, Saigusa & Masunaga, 2002
Hercostomus emeiensis Yang, 1997
Hercostomus emotoi Yang, Saigusa & Masunaga, 2002
Hercostomus enghoffi Grichanov, 1999
Hercostomus erectus Yang & Grootaert, 1999
Hercostomus eugenii Stackelberg, 1949
Hercostomus exacutus Wei, 1997
Hercostomus exarticulatoides Stackelberg, 1949
Hercostomus exarticulatus (Loew, 1857)
Hercostomus excertus Wei & Song, 2006
Hercostomus excipiens Becker, 1907
Hercostomus excisilamellatus Parent, 1944
Hercostomus falcilis Negrobov, Kumazawa & Tago, 2016
Hercostomus fanjingensis Wei, 1997
Hercostomus fatuus Wei, 1997
Hercostomus fedotovae Grichanov, 2020
Hercostomus filiformis Yang & Saigusa, 2001
Hercostomus fistulus Wei, 1997
Hercostomus flatus Yang & Grootaert, 1999
Hercostomus flavicans Grootaert & Meuffels, 2001
Hercostomus flavicinctus Becker, 1922
Hercostomus flavicoxus Negrobov & Logvinovskij, 1977
Hercostomus flavimaculatus Yang, 1998
Hercostomus flavimanus Van Duzee in Curran, 1934
Hercostomus flavimarginatus Yang, 1999
Hercostomus flavipalpus Negrobov, Kumazawa, Tago & Sato, 2016
Hercostomus flavipes (von Roder, 1884)
Hercostomus flaviscapus Yang & Saigusa, 2000
Hercostomus flaviscutellum Yang, 1998
Hercostomus flaviventris Smirnov & Negrobov, 1979
Hercostomus flavus Tang, Zhang & Yang, 2014
Hercostomus flexus Wei, 1997
Hercostomus flutatus Harmston & Knowlton, 1945
Hercostomus fluvius Wei, 1997
Hercostomus fluxus Wei, 1997
Hercostomus freidbergi Grichanov, 2004
Hercostomus frondosus Wei, 1997
Hercostomus fugax (Loew, 1857)
Hercostomus fulgidipes (Becker, 1922)
Hercostomus fulvicaudis (Haliday in Walker, 1851)
Hercostomus fupingensis Yang & Saigusa, 2002
Hercostomus furcatus Yang, 1996
Hercostomus furcutus Wei, 1997
Hercostomus fuscipennis (Meigen, 1824)
Hercostomus galonglaensis Tang, Zhang & Yang, 2014
Hercostomus gansuensis Yang, 1996
Hercostomus gaoae Yang, Grootaert & Song, 2002
Hercostomus gavarniae Parent, 1927
Hercostomus geminatus Becker, 1922
Hercostomus geniculatus Zhang, Yang & Masunaga, 2007
Hercostomus germanus (Wiedemann, 1817)
Hercostomus golanensis Grichanov, 2015
Hercostomus gongshanensis Zhang & Yang, 2010
Hercostomus gracilior Negrobov, 1976
Hercostomus gracilis (Stannius, 1831)
Hercostomus grandicercus Negrobov & Nechay, 2009
Hercostomus gregalis Becker, 1922
Hercostomus griseifrons Becker, 1910
Hercostomus gymnopygus Frey, 1925
Hercostomus hainanensis Zhang, Wei & Yang, 2009
Hercostomus heinrichi Grichanov, 2004
Hercostomus henanus Yang, 1999
Hercostomus himertus Wei, 1997
Hercostomus histus Wei, 1997
Hercostomus hoplitus Wei & Song, 2006
Hercostomus huaguoensis Zhang & Yang, 2007
Hercostomus hualienensis Zhang, Yang & Masunaga, 2005
Hercostomus huanglianshanus Yang & Saigusa, 2001
Hercostomus hubeiensis Yang & Saigusa, 2001
Hercostomus huizhouensis Zhang, Yang & Grootaert, 2008
Hercostomus humeralis Frey, 1925
Hercostomus hunanensis Yang, 1998
Hercostomus hypogaeus Wei & Song, 2006
Hercostomus ibericus Naglis & Bartak, 2015
Hercostomus ignarus Wei & Song, 2006
Hercostomus imperfectus (Becker, 1922)
Hercostomus impudicus Wheeler, 1899
Hercostomus incilis Yang & Saigusa, 2001
Hercostomus incisus Yang & Saigusa, 2000
Hercostomus inclusus Becker, 1922
Hercostomus incrassatus Becker, 1922
Hercostomus indistinctus Yang, Saigusa & Masunaga, 2002
Hercostomus infirmus Parent, 1933
Hercostomus insularum Becker, 1917
Hercostomus intactus Wei, 1997
Hercostomus intercedens Grichanov, 2004
Hercostomus interstinctus Becker, 1922
Hercostomus intraneus Yang & Saigusa, 2001
†Hercostomus inumbratus (Meunier, 1907)
Hercostomus javanensis (De Meijere, 1916)
Hercostomus jindinganus Yang & Saigusa, 2000
Hercostomus jingpingensis Yang & Saigusa, 2001
Hercostomus jingxingensis Yang & Saigusa, 2001
Hercostomus jinxiuensis Yang, 1997
Hercostomus jiulongensis Zhang & Yang, 2005
Hercostomus kedrovicus Negrobov & Logvinovskij, 1977
Hercostomus kefaensis Grichanov, 2004
Hercostomus koshelevae Grichanov, 2020
Hercostomus kravchenkoi Grichanov & Freidberg, 2018
Hercostomus krivosheinae Grichanov, 1999
Hercostomus labiatus (Loew, 1871)
Hercostomus lanceolatus Zhang, Yang & Grootaert, 2008
Hercostomus lateralis Yang & Saigusa, 1999
Hercostomus latilobatus Yang & Saigusa, 2001
Hercostomus latus Yang & Saigusa, 2002
Hercostomus laufferi (Strobl, 1909)
Hercostomus leigongshanus Wei & Yang, 2007
Hercostomus lelepanus Yang, Saigusa & Masunaga, 2002
Hercostomus libanicola Parent, 1933
Hercostomus lichtwardti Villeneuve, 1899
Hercostomus lijiangensis Yang & Saigusa, 2001
Hercostomus limosus Zhang, Yang & Grootaert, 2008
Hercostomus litargus Wei, 1997
Hercostomus longicercus Yang & Yang, 1995
Hercostomus longidigitatus Yang & Saigusa, 2001
Hercostomus longifolius Yang & Saigusa, 2000
Hercostomus longilamellus Harmston & Knowlton, 1940
Hercostomus longilobatus Yang & Saigusa, 2001
Hercostomus longipulvinatus Yang, 1998
Hercostomus longisetus Yang & Saigusa, 2000
Hercostomus longispinus Yang & Saigusa, 2001
Hercostomus longiventris (Loew, 1857)
Hercostomus longus Yang & Saigusa, 2000
Hercostomus longyuwanensis Zhang, Yang & Grootaert, 2008
Hercostomus lotus Yang & Saigusa, 2002
Hercostomus loushanguananus Yang & Saigusa, 2001
Hercostomus lucidiventris Becker, 1922
Hercostomus lunulatus Becker, 1922
Hercostomus luoshanensis Yang & Saigusa, 2000
Hercostomus luteipleuratus Parent, 1944
Hercostomus luteus Parent, 1927
Hercostomus macropygus De Meijere, 1916
Hercostomus maculithorax Stackelberg, 1931
Hercostomus magnicornis (De Meijere, 1916)
Hercostomus maoershanensis Zhang, Yang & Masunaga, 2004
Hercostomus marginatus Yang & Saigusa, 2001
Hercostomus masunagai Yang & Saigusa, 2001
Hercostomus medialis Yang & Saigusa, 2001
Hercostomus meieri Zhang, Yang & Grootaert, 2008
Hercostomus mengyangensis Zhang & Yang, 2010
Hercostomus minutus Negrobov & Logvinovskij, 1977
Hercostomus modestus (De Meijere, 1916)
Hercostomus modificatus Yang & Saigusa, 2002
Hercostomus mostovskii Grichanov, 1999
Hercostomus motuoensis Zhang, Yang & Grootaert, 2008
Hercostomus nakanishii Yang, Saigusa & Masunaga, 2002
Hercostomus nanjingensis Yang, 1996
Hercostomus nanlingensis Zhang, Yang & Grootaert, 2008
Hercostomus nantouensis Zhang, Yang & Grootaert, 2008
Hercostomus nanus (Macquart, 1827)
Hercostomus napoensis Yang, Grootaert & Song, 2002
Hercostomus nartshukae Negrobov & Logvinovskij, 1976
Hercostomus nectarophagus Curran, 1924
Hercostomus neglectus Becker, 1922
Hercostomus neimengensis Yang, 1997
Hercostomus neocryptus Harmston & Knowlton, 1941
Hercostomus nepalensis Yang, Saigusa & Masunaga, 2002
Hercostomus ngozi Grichanov, 2004
Hercostomus nigricollaris Negrobov, Kumazawa & Tago, 2016
Hercostomus nigrilamellatus (Macquart, 1827)
Hercostomus nigripalpus Yang & Saigusa, 2002
Hercostomus nigripennis (Fallén, 1823)
Hercostomus nigriplantis (Stannius, 1831)
Hercostomus nigrohalteratus Becker, 1909
Hercostomus notatus Becker, 1922
Hercostomus nuciformis Tang, Zhang & Yang, 2014
Hercostomus nudiusculus Yang, 1999
Hercostomus nudus Yang, 1996
Hercostomus obesus Wei, 1997
Hercostomus occidentalis Cole, 1912
Hercostomus ogloblini Stackelberg, 1949
Hercostomus orbicularis Harmston, 1952
Hercostomus ovalicosta Hollis, 1964
Hercostomus ovatus Becker, 1922
Hercostomus ozerovi Grichanov, 1999
Hercostomus pachynervis Ramos & Grootaert, 2018
Hercostomus pailongensis Tang, Zhang & Yang, 2014
Hercostomus pallidus Loew, 1871
Hercostomus pallipilosus Yang & Saigusa, 2002
Hercostomus panamensis Van Duzee, 1931
Hercostomus pandellei Parent, 1926
Hercostomus papunanus Yang, Saigusa & Masunaga, 2002
Hercostomus patellitarsis (Parent, 1934)
Hercostomus peronus Wei, 1997
Hercostomus perspicillatus Wei, 1997
Hercostomus perturbus Curran, 1924
Hercostomus petulans Parent, 1939
Hercostomus phaedrus Wei, 1997
Hercostomus philpotti Parent, 1933
Hercostomus phoebus Parent, 1927
Hercostomus phollae Hollis, 1964
Hercostomus pilicercus Yang & Saigusa, 2001
Hercostomus pilifacies Yang & Saigusa, 2001
Hercostomus pingwuensis Qilemoge, Liu & Yang, 2017
Hercostomus placidus (Loew, 1873)
Hercostomus plagiatus (Loew, 1857)
Hercostomus plumatus Zhang, Yang & Grootaert, 2008
Hercostomus plumiger Yang & Saigusa, 2002
Hercostomus pokivajlovi Maslova & Negrobov, 2011
Hercostomus pokornyi Mik, 1889
Hercostomus polleti Yang & Saigusa, 1999
Hercostomus pollinifrons Parent, 1933
Hercostomus porrectus Becker, 1922
Hercostomus praetentans Lamb, 1924
Hercostomus problematicus Parent, 1930
Hercostomus proboscideus Becker, 1907
Hercostomus productus Wei, 1997
Hercostomus projectus Yang & Saigusa, 2001
Hercostomus prolongatus Yang, 1996
Hercostomus promotus Becker, 1922
Hercostomus qingchenganus Yang, 1998
Hercostomus qinlingensis Yang & Saigusa, 2002
Hercostomus quadratus Yang & Grootaert, 1999
Hercostomus quadriseta Yang & Saigusa, 2001
†Hercostomus quievreuxi Parent & Quievreux, 1935
Hercostomus radialis Stackelberg, 1933
Hercostomus regularis Becker, 1922
Hercostomus riparius Negrobov & Grichanov, 1982
Hercostomus rivulorum Stackelberg, 1933
Hercostomus rogenhoferi (Mik, 1878)
Hercostomus rostellatus (Loew, 1871)
Hercostomus rothi (Zetterstedt, 1859)
Hercostomus rubroviridis Parent, 1927
Hercostomus rubroviridissimus Negrobov, 1977
Hercostomus ruficauda (Zetterstedt, 1859)
Hercostomus rusticus (Meigen, 1824)
Hercostomus saetiger Yang & Saigusa, 2002
Hercostomus sahlbergi (Zetterstedt, 1838)
Hercostomus saigusai Olejnichek, 2004
Hercostomus sanipass Grichanov, 2020
Hercostomus sanjiangyuanus Liao, Zhou & Yang, 2009
Hercostomus santosi Parent, 1929
Hercostomus saranganicus Stackelberg, 1931
Hercostomus sartus Stackelberg, 1927
Hercostomus scotti Grichanov, 1999
Hercostomus selikhovkini Grichanov, 1999
Hercostomus separatus d'Assis Fonseca, 1976
Hercostomus sequens Becker, 1922
Hercostomus serratus Yang & Saigusa, 1999
Hercostomus serriformis Liao, Zhou & Yang, 2006
Hercostomus setitibia Kazerani & Pollet, 2017
Hercostomus setosus (Van Duzee, 1913)
Hercostomus shelkovnikovi Stackelberg, 1926
Hercostomus shennongjiensis Yang, 1997
Hercostomus shimai Yang & Saigusa, 2001
Hercostomus sichuanensis Yang, 1997
Hercostomus singaporensis Zhang, Yang & Grootaert, 2008
Hercostomus sinicus Stackelberg, 1933
Hercostomus siveci Zhang, Yang & Masunaga, 2005
Hercostomus sodalis Becker, 1922
Hercostomus solutus Wei, 1997
Hercostomus songshanensis Zhang & Yang, 2011
Hercostomus spathulatus Negrobov, Kumazawa, Tago & Sato, 2016
Hercostomus spatiosus Yang, 1996
Hercostomus spiniger Yang, 1997
Hercostomus spinitarsis Yang & Saigusa, 2000
Hercostomus spinitibialis Negrobov, Kumazawa & Tago, 2016
Hercostomus stigmatifer Parent, 1944
Hercostomus stroblianus Becker, 1917
Hercostomus subapicispinus Yang & Saigusa, 2002
Hercostomus subdentatus Yang, Saigusa & Masunaga, 2002
Hercostomus subdigitatus Yang & Saigusa, 2001
Hercostomus sublongus Yang & Saigusa, 2000
Hercostomus subnovus Yang & Yang, 1995
Hercostomus subrusticus Zhang, Yang & Grootaert, 2008
Hercostomus subtruncatus Yang & Saigusa, 2002
Hercostomus sviridovae Negrobov & Chalaya, 1987
Hercostomus synolcus Steyskal, 1966
Hercostomus tadzhikorum Stackelberg, 1933
Hercostomus taipeiensis Zhang, Yang & Masunaga, 2005
Hercostomus taitungensis Zhang, Yang & Masunaga, 2005
Hercostomus taiwanensis Zhang, Yang & Masunaga, 2005
Hercostomus takagii Smirnov & Negrobov, 1979
Hercostomus tankanus Yang, Saigusa & Masunaga, 2002
Hercostomus tenebricosus Vaillant, 1973
Hercostomus thraciensis Kechev & Negrobov, 2015
Hercostomus thudamanus Yang, Saigusa & Masunaga, 2002
Hercostomus tianeensis Zhang & Yang, 2003
Hercostomus tianlinensis Zhang & Yang, 2003
Hercostomus tibialis (Van Duzee, 1913)
Hercostomus tiomanensis Zhang, Yang & Grootaert, 2007
Hercostomus tjibodas (De Meijere, 1916)
Hercostomus tobiasi Grichanov, 1999
Hercostomus tonguci Naglis & Negrobov, 2017
Hercostomus transsylvanicus Parvu, 1987
Hercostomus triseta Yang & Saigusa, 2001
Hercostomus truncatus Harmston & Knowlton, 1940
Hercostomus tugajorum Stackelberg, 1949
Hercostomus tuomunanus Yang & Saigusa, 2001
Hercostomus turanicola Stackelberg, 1949
Hercostomus udeorum Stackelberg, 1933
Hercostomus udovenkovae Negrobov & Logvinovskij, 1977
Hercostomus ulleriensis Hollis, 1964
Hercostomus ulrichi Yang, 1996
Hercostomus unicolor (Loew, 1864)
Hercostomus uniformis Yang & Saigusa, 2001
Hercostomus utahensis Harmston & Knowlton, 1940
Hercostomus uzbekorum Stackelberg, 1933
Hercostomus vanduzeei (Curran, 1930)
Hercostomus ventralis Yang & Saigusa, 1999
Hercostomus verbekei Pollet, 1993
Hercostomus vikhrevi Grichanov, 2020
Hercostomus vivax (Loew, 1857)
Hercostomus vockerothi d'Assis Fonseca, 1976
Hercostomus vodjanovi Negrobov, Maslova & Selivanova, 2016
Hercostomus wangi Tang, Pan & Yang, 2016
Hercostomus wasatchensis Harmston & Knowlton, 1943
Hercostomus wittei Grichanov, 1999
Hercostomus wudangshanus Yang, 1997
Hercostomus wuhongi Yang, 1997
Hercostomus wui Yang, 1997
Hercostomus xanthocerus Parent, 1926
Hercostomus xanthodes Yang & Grootaert, 1999
Hercostomus xiaolongmensis Yang & Saigusa, 2001
Hercostomus xigouensis Yang & Saigusa, 2005
Hercostomus xinjianganus Yang, 1996
Hercostomus xishuangbannensis Yang & Grootaert, 1999
Hercostomus xishuiensis Wei & Song, 2005
Hercostomus xixianus Yang, 1999
Hercostomus xizangensis Yang, 1996
Hercostomus yadonganus Yang, 1997
Hercostomus yakovlevi Grichanov, 1999
Hercostomus yangi Olejnicek, 2003
Hercostomus yefremovae Grichanov & Freidberg, 2018
Hercostomus yinshanus Liao, Zhou & Yang, 2009
Hercostomus yiyanganus Zhang & Yang, 2008
Hercostomus yongpingensis Yang & Saigusa, 2001
Hercostomus yunlongensis Yang & Saigusa, 2001
Hercostomus yunnanensis Wei, 1997
Hercostomus zhangae Tang, Pan & Yang, 2016
Hercostomus zhenzhuristi Smirnov & Negrobov, 1979
Hercostomus zieheni Parent, 1929
Hercostomus zunyianus Yang & Saigusa, 2001
Hercostomus zuoshuiensis Yang & Saigusa, 2002
Hercostomus zygolipes (Grootaert & Meuffels, 2001)

Synonyms:
Hercostomus tanjusilus Negrobov & Zurikov, 1988: synonym of Hercostomus exarticulatus (Loew, 1857)
Phalacrosoma briarea Wei & Lu, 1996: synonym of Hercostomus zhenzhuristi Smirnov & Negrobov, 1979
Phalacrosoma sichuanense Yang & Saigusa, 1999: synonym of Aphalacrosoma modestus (Wei, 1998)

Species moved to other genera:
Hercostomus appendiculatus (Loew, 1859): moved to Poecilobothrus
Hercostomus brevipilosus Yang & Saigusa, 2002: moved to Poecilobothrus, synonym of Poecilobothrus pterostichoides (Stackelberg, 1934)
Hercostomus brunus Wei, 1997: moved to Poecilobothrus
Hercostomus cucullus Wei, 1997: moved to Poecilobothrus
Hercostomus cyaneculus Wei, 1997: moved to Poecilobothrus
Hercostomus daubichensis Stackelberg, 1933: moved to Gymnopternus
Hercostomus flaveolus Negrobov & Chalaya, 1987: moved to Poecilobothrus
Hercostomus lii Yang, 1996: moved to Poecilobothrus
Hercostomus longipilosus Yang & Saigusa, 2001: moved to Poecilobothrus
Hercostomus luchunensis Yang & Saigusa, 2001: moved to Poecilobothrus
Hercostomus mentougouensis Zhang, Yang & Grootaert, 2003: moved to Poecilobothrus
Hercostomus morenae (Strobl, 1899): moved to Ortochile
Hercostomus nemorum Smirnov & Negrobov, 1977: moved to Gymnopternus
Hercostomus palustris Wei, 2006: moved to Poecilobothrus
Hercostomus parvilamellatus (Macquart, 1827): moved to Sybistroma
Hercostomus parvulus Parent, 1927: moved to Sybistroma
Hercostomus potanini Stackelberg, 1933: moved to Poecilobothrus
Hercostomus pterostichoides Stackelberg, 1934: moved to Poecilobothrus
Hercostomus rohdendorfi Stackelberg, 1933: moved to Gymnopternus
Hercostomus saetosus Yang & Saigusa, 2002: moved to Poecilobothrus
Hercostomus singularis Yang & Saigusa, 2001: moved to Poecilobothrus
Phalacrosoma hubeiense Yang, 1998: moved to Aphalacrosoma
Phalacrosoma postiseta Yang & Saigusa, 2001: moved to Aphalacrosoma
Phalacrosoma zhejiangense Yang, 1997: moved to Poecilobothrus

References

Hercostomus